Tulkan (also Romanized as Tūlkān) is a village in Baranduzchay-ye Jonubi Rural District, in the Central District of Urmia County, West Azerbaijan Province, Iran. At the 2006 census, the population was 455, in 106 families.

References 

Populated places in Urmia County